Georg Algot Haglund (19 September 1905 – 17 October 1963) was a Swedish international footballer, international bandy player and ice hockey player.

Algot Haglund was the brother of Djurgården ice hockey goaltender Curt Haglund.

Career
As a footballer, Algot Haglund represented Djurgården, AIK and Johannespojkarna. For Djurgården, he played 20 Allsvenskan games and scored 2 goals. He made 7 appearances and scored 4 goals for Sweden national football team. Haglund made his international debut in a friendly against Estonia where he also scored one goal.

As an ice hockey player Haglund represented Djurgården.

As a bandy player, Haglund represented Djurgården and AIK and was awarded Stora Grabbars och Tjejers Märke. He made 6 appearences for the national bandy team.

Honours

Club 
 AIK
 Swedish Champion: 1931

References 

Swedish footballers
Swedish bandy players
Swedish ice hockey players
Allsvenskan players
Djurgårdens IF Fotboll players
AIK Fotboll players
Djurgårdens IF Bandy players
AIK Bandy players
Djurgårdens IF Hockey players
1905 births
1963 deaths
Sweden international footballers
Sweden international bandy players
Association football forwards